A gaff is a piece of fabric, usually augmented by an elastic such as a rubber band, that is designed to hide a penile bulge. It is usually worn by trans women or male cross-dressers. Since the 2010s, underwear manufacturers have begun to design underwear with the same function as gaffs. Home-made gaffs are often made by cutting the ends off a single sock, then placing a pair of elastic loops through them. The main function of gaffs (or underwear that replicates gaffs) is to hide a crotch bulge and make the groin appear smoother and flatter.

Similar products
In 2019, Pornhub, an adult entertainment company, developed a boxer short brand that is designed with an inner lining that prevents erections from protruding through clothes, thus concealing the public visibility of the camel-back (penile genital bulge).

References

Cross-dressing
Gender transitioning
Trans women
Undergarments